Catherine Cornille (born 1961) is a professor of comparative theology and specializes in theology of religions and interreligious dialogue. She presently holds the Newton College Alumnae Chair of Western Culture in the department of theology at Boston College.

Biography 
With a previous B.A. from the KU Leuven and an M.A. from the University of Hawaii, Cornille returned to KU Leuven to complete her PhD in 1989. She taught comparative religions at the KU Leuven and was the first woman professor in the history of the University. She joined the department of theology at Boston College in 2005 and teaches comparative theology, theology of religions, and interreligious dialogue.

Works

References 

1961 births
Living people
Boston College faculty
Religious studies scholars
Women Christian theologians
KU Leuven alumni
University of Hawaiʻi alumni